Larry King (1933–2021) was an American broadcaster. 

Larry or Laurence or Lawrence King may also refer to:

People 
 Lawrence Fobes King (1993–2008), also known as Latisha King, 15-year-old student murdered by a fellow student
 Lawrence E. King, Jr., former manager of the Franklin Community Federal Credit Union in Omaha, associated with the Franklin child prostitution ring allegations
 Larry King (musician) (born 1966), musician from Chicago and member of Soleil Moon
 Larry L. King (1929–2012), playwright of the stage and film musical The Best Little Whorehouse in Texas
 Larry King (tennis) (born 1945), former husband of Billie Jean King and a founder of World TeamTennis
 Lawrence King (sociologist) (born 1966), professor of sociology and political economy at the University of Cambridge

Fiction 
 Larry King (King of Kensington), title character on the Canadian Broadcasting Corporation television series King of Kensington
 Larry King (30 Rock), an episode of the American television comedy series 30 Rock

Others
Laurence King Publishing, London-based British publishing company